Transtillaspis zamorana is a species of moth of the family Tortricidae. It is found in Loja Province, Ecuador.

The wingspan is about 18 mm for males and 22 mm for females.  The ground colour of the forewings is pale brownish cream, but darker in the basal area. The suffusions and strigulation (fine streaks) is brownish and there are some brown spots. The hindwings are cream with weak brownish suffusions and pale brownish strigulation. The ground colour of the forewings of the females is greyish brown, without strigulation. The markings are browner than in males, with sparse blackish dots.

Etymology
The species name refers to the name of the Zamora-Chinchipe Province in Ecuador, although the Loja Province is given as the type location.

References

Moths described in 2008
Transtillaspis
Taxa named by Józef Razowski